CPC Cine Awards was an annual awards ceremony for films in the Malayalam film industry, which was crowd-sourced and hosted by a Facebook group named Cinema Paradiso Club.

History
Cinema Paradiso Club, also known as CPC, was formed by a group of cinephiles in the year 2010 in Kerala, India. The first crowd-sourced CPC Cine Awards was announced in 2016 for the films released in 2015 in the malayalam film industry. The winners were decided by a combination of votes from members of a Facebook group and a jury. CPC Cine Awards 2017 had a change in the polling system, that the poll was open to the public. The 2017 winners were declared and announced to the public on 27 January 2018 CPC Cine Awards 2018 winners were declared on 28 January 2019 and distributed at a ceremony on 17 February 2019 at IMA House, Kochi

Awards ceremonies

CPC Cine Awards 2015 had no official ceremony. The 2016 award ceremony was held on 19 February 2017 at Cochin Palace Hotel, Kochi. Since it was a crowd sourced event, the program did not invite much media attention initially. The reactions from award winners like Vinayakan, Rajisha Vijayan, Indrans, Manikandan R Achari, Dileesh Pothan, Syam Pushkaran etc. made the news and as such awards received some media attention. CPC Cine Awards 2017 award ceremony was held on 18 February 2018 at IMA House, Kochi. The event's major draw was honouring veteran filmmaker K G George. He was draped with a ‘ponnada’(shawl) by filmmakers Sathyan Anthikad, Sibi Malayil and Kamal. Also a documentary film by the name '8 ½ Intercuts – Life and Films of K G George' that was based on the life and career of KG George was screened at the event. CPC Cine Awards 2018 award ceremony was held on 17 February 2019 at IMA House, Kochi. In the event, the senior stunt master Thyagarajan was honored with Special Honorary Award. He was draped with a ‘ponnada’(shawl) by actor Joju George and scriptwriter P. F. Mathews. The CPC Cine Awards 2019 award ceremony was held on 16 February 2020 at IMA House, Kochi . In the event, the two film production houses Udaya Studios, Merryland Studios were honored with Special Honorary Award

Winners

CPC Cine Awards 2019

CPC Cine Awards 2018

CPC Cine Awards 2017

CPC Cine Awards 2016

CPC Cine Awards 2015

Criticism

Controversies

CPC Cine Awards 2018 was criticized for not including actors Dileep and Alencier Ley Lopez in the final nominations. The club had declared the removal of these actors from the 2018 awards with respect to their alleged involvement in serious abuse cases against certain women co-actors which awaited court judgment.

References

Indian film awards
2016  establishments in Kerala
Awards established in 2016
Kerala awards